Jean Baptiste Point DuSable High School is a public high school campus located in the Bronzeville neighborhood on the South Side of Chicago, Illinois, United States. DuSable is owned by the Chicago Public Schools district. The school was named after Chicago's first permanent non-native settler, Jean Baptiste Point Du Sable. Constructed between 1931 and 1934, DuSable opened in February 1935. 

Since 2005, the school campus serves as home to two smaller schools: the Bronzeville Scholastic Institute and the Daniel Hale Williams Preparatory School of Medicine. Both of the schools use the DuSable name in an athletics context. The DuSable Leadership Academy was housed at the location until it closed after the 2015–16 school year. The school building was designated a Chicago Landmark on May 1, 2013.

History 
Work on the school began in February 1931, and was specifically constructed to accommodate the increasing population of Phillips High School.  Construction was delayed for financial reasons, and was completed with a public works grant.  The school opened on February 4, 1935, and was called New Wendell Phillips High School.  New Phillips was a part of a five high school expansion that included Lane Tech High School, Steinmetz High School, Senn High School, and Wells High School. The building was designed by Paul Gerhardt Sr., an architect for the Chicago Board of Education.

On April 25, 1936, the school's name was changed to honor Jean Baptiste Point DuSable, the first non-native to settle the area; however there was a delay in implementing the name, as the exact spelling was in dispute. During the 1940s on thru the 1960s, DuSable enrollment was more than 4,000 which prompted two graduation ceremonies (spring and summer). During this period, DuSable became notable for its music program: Captain Walter Dyett was the longtime music instructor at the school. By the late 1950s, DuSable was surrounded by the Robert Taylor Homes, a Chicago Housing Authority public housing project and approximately 80% of the student population were residents. The Robert Taylor Homes project was demolished in stages between 1998 and 2007.

Renaissance 2010 
With the demolition of the Robert Taylor Homes, student enrolment at DuSable had substantially declined. Because of this, in 2003, Chicago Public Schools decided to phase out DuSable: the history of poor academic performance was also a factor. In 2005, three schools were opened in the building as a part of the Renaissance 2010 program. The three new schools:  Bronzeville Scholastic Institute, Daniel Hale Williams School of Medicine and DuSable Leadership Academy were created by DuSable staff members. The DuSable Leadership Academy which was a part of the Betty Shabazz International Charter School was phased out due to poor academic performance and closed after the 2015–16 school year.

Small schools

Bronzeville Scholastic 
Bronzeville Scholastic Institute High School (BSI)  is a public 4–year high school located in the Bronzeville neighborhood on the south side of Chicago, Illinois, United States.
The school is named after the community in which it is located, Bronzeville. In 1930, the editor of the Chicago Bee used the name in a campaign to elect the "mayor of Bronzeville".  After a physician was elected in 1945, the community began to use the name Bronzeville.  It reflected both the dominant skin color of the members of the community, and an attempt to raise the community's and outsiders' favor toward the area, as the word "bronze" had a more positive connotation than "black." Bronzeville Scholastic Institute was opened in 2005 as a Performance School in the Chicago Public Schools' Renaissance 2010, which was an effort to create more quality schools across the city of Chicago.

Williams Preparatory 
Daniel Hale Williams Preparatory School of Medicine High School (DHW) is a public 4–year career academy high school and academic center The academic center serves 9th through 12th grade students. The school opened in September 2005 as a part of the Chicago Public Schools' Renaissance 2010 program. The school is named for Daniel Hale Williams, an African-American doctor who performed the first successful open heart surgery.  Helping minority students get into medical school and become future members of the medical field is central to DHW's mission and vision. The school celebrated its first graduating class in 2011.

Other information 
Chicago Public Schools and the Chicago Board of Education opened a birth control clinic in the school in June 1985, in efforts to lower the school's high teen-age pregnancy and drop-out rates. The opening of the clinic caused worldwide controversy. The school once held an inner sanctuary that had many different animals, including peacocks, a goat, snakes, pigeons, chickens, and various other species. Emiel Hamberlin, the schools' biology teacher and sanctuary was featured in the March 1977 issue of Ebony magazine. In 1995, with funding from NASA, DuSable became the first public high school in Chicago to be connected to the Internet. DuSable principal Charles Mingo created the "Second-Chance Program", a program that served as an alternative school for recent high school drop-outs and adults looking to earn a high school diploma in 1994.

Crime and gang violence 
In November 1949, 16–year old LaVon Cain was shot to death at the school after a group of females began firing shots at another group of female students. 19–year-old Edwina Howard and two other teenage girls were charged in the shooting. The shooting is recorded as one of the first fatal shootings in a Chicago public school. In October 1959, two female students were sexually assaulted by a male mail carrier in the school. In September 1968, twelve students were arrested in a gang retaliation shooting at the school. By 1976, the school had developed a reputation for concurring problems with gang violence. In January 1986, a 15–year-old male student was stabbed by another student. On October 13, 1987, 15–year-old freshmen Dartagnan Young was shot to death in a gang–related shooting in the hallway on the school's third floor shortly after 8 a.m. by 16–year-old sophomore Larry Sims. Witnesses said Young was shot after arguing with Sims over street–gang activity from the previous day. The murder prompted some students to transfer from DuSable that day and days following.

Athletics 
DuSable competes in the Chicago Public League (CPL) and is a member of the Illinois High School Association (IHSA). DuSable sport teams are nicknamed Panthers. The boys' basketball team were Public League champions two times (1952–53, 1953–54) and regional champions twice (2011–12, 2012–13), Sectionals champion in 2012. The girls' track and field team were Class AA in 1977–78. The boys' track and field were public league champions in 1937–38 and placed 3rd during the 1941–42 season.

Notable alumni

Performing arts

Public service 

 
 William Cousins, Illinois Appellate Court judge and Chicago City Council member

Radio, TV, and film

Commerce

Alumni gallery

Notable staff 
 Captain Walter Dyett — noted violinist and music instructor at the school from its opening in 1935 until 1962.
Charles Mingo — educator and former principal of DuSable from 1988 until 2002, his work at the school earned him a Milken National Educator Award in 1993.
 Margaret Taylor-Burroughs  — writer and artist who taught at the school for 23 years.  She is best known for co-founding the DuSable Museum of African American History.

References

External links 

 Chicago Public Schools DuSable page
 Chicago (DuSable) on Illinois High School Association website

1935 establishments in Illinois
Educational institutions established in 1935
Chicago Landmarks
Public high schools in Chicago
South Side, Chicago